Andrei Alekseyevich Alekseyev (born 6 May 1997) is a Russian football player. He plays for FC Metallurg Lipetsk.

Club career
He made his debut in the Russian Football National League for FC Chertanovo Moscow on 9 October 2020 in a game against FC Krasnodar-2.

References

External links
 Profile by Russian Football National League
 

1997 births
People from Syzran
Sportspeople from Samara Oblast
Living people
Russian footballers
Russia youth international footballers
Association football defenders
FC Chertanovo Moscow players
FC Torpedo Moscow players
FC Volgar Astrakhan players
FC Urozhay Krasnodar players
FC Olimp-Dolgoprudny players
FC Metallurg Lipetsk players
Russian First League players
Russian Second League players